No Way Out may refer to:

Film and television
No Way Out (1950 film), a film starring Richard Widmark and Sidney Poitier
No Way Out (1973 film), a film starring Alain Delon and Richard Conte
No Way Out (1987 film), a film starring Kevin Costner and Gene Hackman
No Way Out, a film starring Héctor Echavarría, Estella Warren, and Danny Trejo
No Way Out, a film starring Keiran Lee
"No Way Out" (Porridge), an episode of Porridge
"No Way Out" (The Walking Dead), an episode of The Walking Dead
"No Way Out", an episode of CSI: Crime Scene Investigation

Literature 
No Way Out (novel), a novel by Nikolai Leskov
No Exit or No Way Out, a play by Jean-Paul Sartre
No Way Out, a Hardy Boys novel
No Way Out, a The Bluford Series book by Peggy Kern

Music
My American Heart or No Way Out
No Way Out (The Chocolate Watchband album) (1967)
No Way Out (Puff Daddy album) (1997)

Songs
"No Way Out" (Phil Collins song), a song from the Brother Bear soundtrack
"No Way Out" (Bullet for My Valentine song)
"No Way Out" (DJ Trevi song)
"No Way Out", a song by Annihilator from Feast
"No Way Out", a song by the Bloods & Crips from Bangin' on Wax
"No Way Out", a song by Bone Thugs-n-Harmony from BTNHResurrection
"No Way Out", a song by Dope from American Apathy
"No Way Out", a song by Electric Light Orchestra from Afterglow
"No Way Out", a song by Jefferson Starship from Nuclear Furniture
"No Way Out", a song by Loudness from Thunder in the East
"No Way Out", a song by Missing Persons from Spring Session M
"No Way Out", a song by Pete Townshend that reworked the Who's "However Much I Booze"
"No Way Out", a song by Peter Gabriel from Up
"No Way Out", a song by Screaming Jets from Scam
"No Way Out", a song by Stone Temple Pilots from No. 4
"No Way Out", a song by Theory of a Deadman from Gasoline

Other uses
WWE No Way Out, a professional wrestling pay-per-view event series

See also
No Way Out 2, a 2017 album by Puff Daddy